Ingrid Ryland (born 29 May 1989) is a Norwegian footballer who plays for Toppserien club Brann. and the Norway national team.

She previously played for Toppserien team Arna-Bjørnar from 2007 until 2014. In January 2015 her transfer to FA WSL club Liverpool was announced. Liverpool failed miserably to defend their WSL title and Ryland was among four players to be released by the club at the end of the 2015 season. She subsequently returned to Norway to sign for Avaldsnes IL.

She was called up to be part of the national team for the UEFA Women's Euro 2013. In the final against Germany at Friends Arena, Ryland was an unused substitute. Anja Mittag's goal gave the Germans their sixth successive European title.

Career statistics

References

External links
 
 Norway national team profile 
 
 
 

1989 births
Living people
Norwegian women's footballers
Norway women's international footballers
Liverpool F.C. Women players
Toppserien players
Avaldsnes IL players
Arna-Bjørnar players
SK Brann Kvinner players
Norwegian expatriate women's footballers
Norwegian expatriate sportspeople in England
Expatriate women's footballers in England
Women's Super League players
Djurgårdens IF Fotboll (women) players
Women's association football fullbacks
2011 FIFA Women's World Cup players